Green Swamp may refer to:

Green Swamp (Florida), a swamp in Florida
Green Swamp Wilderness Preserve, a preserve on Florida's Green Swamp
Green Swamp (North Carolina), a swamp in North Carolina
Green Swamp, former name of the area of Inverell, New South Wales, Australia
The Green Swamp, a 1916 silent film